Mesadenella is a genus of flowering plants from the orchid family, Orchidaceae. It consists of 7 known species, native to Mexico, Central America and South America:

Mesadenella angustisegmenta Garay - Venezuela, Ecuador
Mesadenella atroviridis (Barb.Rodr.) Garay - Brazil
Mesadenella cuspidata (Lindl.) Garay - from Colombia east to Guyana and south to Argentina
Mesadenella meeae R.J.V.Alves - Brazil
Mesadenella peruviana Garay - Peru 
Mesadenella tonduzii (Schltr.) Pabst & Garay - from southern Mexico south to Nicaragua; also Pará region of Brazil
Mesadenella variegata D.E.Benn. & Christenson - Peru

See also 
 List of Orchidaceae genera

References 

  (1953) Archivos do Jardim Botânico do Rio de Janeiro 12: 207–208.
  (2003) Genera Orchidacearum 3: 222 ff. Oxford University Press.
 2005. Handbuch der Orchideen-Namen. Dictionary of Orchid Names. Dizionario dei nomi delle orchidee. Ulmer, Stuttgart

External links 

Cranichideae genera
Spiranthinae